Justin Jeremy Gimelstob (born January 26, 1977) is a retired American tennis player. Gimelstob has been a resident of Morristown, New Jersey, and as of 2009 lived in Santa Monica, California.

He was the top-ranked boy in his age group at the ages of 12, 14, 16, and 18.  As a pro, he made the final of the Newport Tournament in singles and has 15 doubles championships to his name, including the 1998 Australian Open and 1998 French Open mixed doubles titles with Venus Williams. He was twice a member of the U.S. Davis Cup team.

In singles matches, he defeated Andre Agassi, Petr Korda, Àlex Corretja, Pat Rafter, and Gustavo Kuerten.  His career singles record is 107–172. His highest career singles ranking was  No. 63 in 1999, and his highest career doubles ranking was No. 18 in 2000.

Gimelstob most recently coached American John Isner.

Tennis career

Juniors

He started playing tennis when he was eight, and was the top-ranked boy in his age group from ages 12 through 18.  In 1991, he was ranked No. 1 in the USTA Boys' 14 age group, and he was No. 1 ranked again in the USTA Boys' 16 age group, winning the USTA championship, in 1993.  He was also ranked No. 1 at age 18, and in 1995 he won the USTA National Boys' 18 Championships.

Gimelstob grew up in the New Vernon section of Harding Township, New Jersey. He graduated from Newark Academy in Livingston, New Jersey, in 1995. As a sophomore at Newark Academy, Gimelstob led the school's tennis team to a 26–0 record and won the state Tournament of Champions.  In 2005, he was entered into the high school's hall of fame, the Newark (N.J.) Academy Hall of Fame.  The high school named its tennis facility after him and his brothers.

Gimelstob, as a resident of Essex Fells, New Jersey, competed in junior tennis.

College and pro careers

In January 1995, Gimelstob enrolled at UCLA, which had offered him a scholarship.  There, he completed his first semester with a 4.0 GPA. He was an All American is his freshman year.

In September 1995, when he defeated David Prinosil in the first round of the U.S. Open it was stated in Sports Illustrated. that Gimelstob was ranked # 1,154 at the time, and Prinosil #85.

Gimelstob turned pro in 1996, after finishing his education at UCLA. At Wimbledon in June 1997 he upset world # 12 Gustavo Kuerten, 6–3, 6–4, 4–6, 1–6, 6–4. In July 1997, he defeated world # 32 Andre Agassi at the ATP event in Los Angeles, 7–5, 6–2, played on the campus of UCLA. Later that month, he defeated world # 16 Petr Korda 6–4, 6–4 in Montreal. Gimelstob then reached the 3rd round at the 1997 US Open.

Gimelstob subsequently established himself chiefly as a doubles specialist, winning 12 titles. In 11 appearances at the US Open, he partnered 11 different players.

He won the 1998 Australian Open and French Open mixed doubles titles, with Venus Williams as his partner. In June 1998 at Wimbledon he beat world No. 9 Àlex Corretja in straight sets. In July he upset world No. 5 Pat Rafter 6–4, 6–3 in Los Angeles.

In March he beat world # 22 Thomas Muster, 6–4, 7–5 in Scottsdale, and in August he upset world # 7 Todd Martin, 6–4, 6–4 in Cincinnati. In June 2000 he beat world No.27 Fabrice Santoro in London, 4–6, 6–4, 6–0. In July he upset world # 19 Mark Philippoussis 3–6, 7–6 (7–5), 7–6 (7–3). In 2001, he and partner Scott Humphries got to the semifinals of the Australian Open. At the US Open, 5' 9" Michal Tabara was fined $1,000 for unsportsmanlike behavior for spitting at Gimelstob after their match. Tabara felt Gimelstob had taken an excessive number of time outs for injuries. "Unless he grows about another foot by the time I get back to the locker room", the 6' 5" Gimelstob said, "he's in trouble."

At the 2002 U.S. Open singles competition, Gimelstob lost in the second round to Andre Agassi. In doubles, he and Jeff Tarango lost in the 2nd round to Brian MacPhee and Nenad Zimonjić, 7–5, 2–6, 6–7 (5–7). In February 2003 he upset world No. 13 Paradorn Srichaphan, 7–5 6–2, in San Jose. At Wimbledon in 2003, he competed in both the singles and doubles events. He upset No. 15 seed Arnaud Clément of France in the second round in five sets. In the third round, Gimelstob lost in three sets to Jonas Björkman of Sweden.

At Wimbledon 2004, Gimelstob and Scott Humphries defeated Bob and Mike Bryan 6–3, 3–6, 6–4 in the second round. They lost to Mark Knowles and Daniel Nestor in the quarterfinals, 3–6, 2–6. In July 2004, Gimelstob won in singles at Forest Hills, New York, beating Dušan Vemić 7–6 (7), 6–2 in the final. That September, he beat Florent Serra of France 6–2, 6–2 in the quarterfinals, and Alex Bogomolov Jr. 6–1, 6–3 in the final of a hard court tournament in Beijing. He also won the doubles event at both of these tournaments, and a singles title at Nashville in November.

Gimelstob made it to the finals in the hard court tournament in Tallahassee in April 2005,. At Wimbledon that year, Gimelstob defeated 29th seed Nicolás Massú in the 2nd round 6–3, 4–6, 7–6 (7–5), 7–6 (7–0). He was eliminated in the 3rd round by Lleyton Hewitt (seeded 3rd) 7–6 (7–5), 6–4, 7–5. In 2006, Gimelstob reached his first ATP Tour Singles Final at The Hall of Fame Championships in Newport, Rhode Island, losing to Mark Philippoussis. In March 2006 he defeated world # 39 Feliciano López, 7–5. 6–3, in Indian Wells. In May he defeated world # 32 Nicolás Massú, 2–6, 7–6 (7–3), 6–4, in the Portugal, and in July he defeated world # 36 Andy Murray, 6–1, 7–6 (4), in the semifinals at Newport, Rhode Island.

In September 2006 he had back surgery to remove two large disc fragments that were putting pressure on the nerves to his right leg, causing him to lose sensation.

In June 2007, Gimelstob lost a contentious 6–4 vote of the ATP Players Council in his attempt to replace Andre Agassi's manager, Perry Rogers, on the men's tour's 3-man board of directors, and to become the first active player on the board.

Gimelstob retired from professional tennis in the fall of 2007. His highest world singles ranking  was # 63, and in doubles, # 18.  In his final singles major, he was defeated by Andy Roddick in the first round of the 2007 U.S. Open, 7–6, 6–3, 6–3. He also played doubles in the 2007 US open. After retirement, he pursued a career in sports commentary, working for Tennis Channel.  He resigned from his position at the Tennis Channel after being convicted of assaulting an acquaintance.

Jewish heritage
Gimelstob is Jewish,   He was an assistant coach of Team USA's tennis squad at the 1981 Maccabiah Games in Israel. Asked in 2003, in the wake of a Vanity Fair magazine article about increased anti-Semitism in France, whether he had been the brunt of anti-Semitism while he was in France for the French Open, he responded that he was uncertain.  "They're so impolite and rude in general, you don't know if they think I'm Jewish or whether I'm just another American tourist".

He is a member of the Southern California Jewish Sports Hall of Fame in 2003.  He was inducted into the MetroWest Jewish Sports Hall of Fame in New Jersey in 2006.

He said he was proud to be a Jewish role model.  He added:  “When I played, I got a lot of support from the Jewish community. People identify me as a Jewish athlete. It's a strong responsibility, and I appreciate that.”

Davis Cup
Gimelstob played for the US Davis Cup team in 1998 and 2001.

Significant finals

Grand Slam finals

Mixed doubles: 2 (2 titles)

ATP Tour career finals

Singles: 1 (1 runner-up)

Doubles: 17 (13 titles, 4 runner-ups)

ATP Challenger and ITF Futures finals

Singles: 16 (9–7)

ATP Challenger and ITF Futures finals

Doubles: 22 (12–10)

Junior Grand Slam finals

Doubles: 1 (1 runner-up)

Grand Slam tournament performance timelines

Singles

Doubles

Mixed doubles

Post-playing career
Gimelstob has been a blogger for Sports Illustrated (under the name "Gimel Takes All"), and has served as a regular commentator for Tennis Channel.  He has also presented tennis features and interviews for the TV Guide channel. Gimelstob was, until his removal (see below) also one of the three  ATP board representatives elected by the ATP player council.

John Isner hired Gimelstob as his new coach at the end of the 2014 season and has been working with him since.

Controversies

On June 17, 2008, when Gimelstob was a guest on the Washington, DC, morning radio show "The Sports Junkies", he referred to French tennis player Tatiana Golovin as a "sexpot", Czech player Nicole Vaidisova as a "well developed young lady", and French player Alizé Cornet as a "little sexpot".

Also in 2008, Gimelstob told Out Magazine: "The locker room couldn't be a more homophobic place. We're not gay-bashing. There's just a lot of positive normal hetero talk about pretty girls and working out and drinking beer. That's why people want to be pro athletes!"

In 2010, Gimelstob was suspended from his Tennis Channel commentating duties for comments he made about President Barack Obama.

In 2016, Gilmelstob's wife Cary sought a restraining order against him, alleging that he “physically assaulted, harassed, verbally attacked, and stole” from her.

On May 1, 2019, Gimelstob resigned from the ATP Player Council after pressure from Stan Wawrinka and Andy Murray. He also resigned from his job at the Tennis Channel.

Assault case 
In November 2018, Gimelstob was charged with assault after being accused of repeatedly striking Randall Kaplan while the venture capitalist, his wife and their two-year-old daughter were trick-or-treating on Halloween in West Los Angeles. Gimelstob denied the accusations. Gilmelstob later changed his plea to "no contest" to a felony battery charge, and was sentenced to three years’ probation and 60 days of community labor.
The wife of the victim attributed the miscarriage of her unborn child to the stress of witnessing the attack.

See also
List of select Jewish tennis players

References

External links

 
 
 
 
 Washington Kastles
 

1977 births
Living people
American male bloggers
American bloggers
American male tennis players
American tennis coaches
Australian Open (tennis) champions
French Open champions
Hopman Cup competitors
Jewish American sportspeople
Jewish tennis players
Newark Academy alumni
Sportspeople from Boca Raton, Florida
People from Essex Fells, New Jersey
People from Harding Township, New Jersey
People from Livingston, New Jersey
People from Morristown, New Jersey
Tennis commentators
Tennis people from Florida
Tennis people from New Jersey
UCLA Bruins men's tennis players
Grand Slam (tennis) champions in mixed doubles
21st-century American Jews